Manchester score is an indicator of prognosis in small cell lung cancer. It is calculated from a number of physical and biochemical markers.

A patient with small cell lung cancer scores one point for each of the following: -
 Serum lactate dehydrogenase exceeds the upper limit of the reference range.
 Serum sodium concentration less than 132 mmol/L.
 Serum alkaline phosphatase over one-and-a-half times the upper limit of the reference range.
 Serum bicarbonate less than 24.
 Karnofsky performance status less than 60.
 Extensive stage disease.

Prognosis

References 

Lung cancer